Novosibirsk State University of Economics and Management, NSUEM (Federal State-Funded Educational Institution of Higher Education «Novosibirsk State University of Economics and Management») is a social and economic higher education institute in Novosibirsk, Russia.

History 

In 1929 Siberian Institute of National Economy was launched in Novosibirsk, and was based in the contemporary building of Novosibirsk State architectural and art Academy. The main aim was to provide the economic managers for the national economics. Teaching staff in 1929 consisted of 10 people and in 1931 it gained up to 57, within them: 4 professors, 19 associate professors.

In the first academic year Institute launched 4 faculties: planned economy, industrial, product exchange and distribution, economic and agricultural management.

In 1967 according to Administrative order by the Minister of high and secondary education ) Novosibirsk Institute of National Economy (NINE) was launched on the basis of All Union correspondence financial-and-economic Institute branch. NINE was launched on the 1 of August 1968. The first rector was Victor Pervushin.

In 1986 Peter Shemetov became rector. He was aimed on pre-entry preparation and bringing up a multi-level educational system in Institute. He launched Doctorate degree education and printing and publications center.

An important place was given to the pre-higher education faculty, which was later transformed into Economic lyceum – the first behind the Urals. In those years there was shortage of qualified specialists in the fields of economics (financiers, accountants, etc.), and the Institute met this demand.

In 1994 the Institute received the status of the Academy, and in 2004, the status of the University. The University status led NSUEM to a new name: Novosibirsk State University of Economics and Management.

Most structures of modern NSUEM were created in post-soviet time.

There are:
     Faculty of Law,
Faculty of Corporate Economics and Entrepreneurship,
 Faculty of Public Sector,
Faculty of Basic Training
     Language Center: Russian Language Courses,
     International business school, where some international educational programs are realized,
     Center of graduates support, etc.

In 1991 Thesis board was organized. In 1992 Institute has become an experimental place to launch double level education system: Bachelor's Degree and master's degree.

In January, 2001 for the first time issued its magazine “Our Academy”

In September 2012 the 5th academic block was delivered, and before that NSUEM launched the 4th academic block.

In 2015 University was reorganized:
     Institutes were formed into faculties;
     New management system was formed (Departments of youth policy, external affairs, informational technologies and scientific policy)

Since 4 February 2021 NSUEM is headed by Pavel Novgorodov.

NSUEM rectors 

 Viktor Pervushin (19 May 1967 – 17 May 1974)
 Viktor Schukin (17 May 1974 – 19 July 1983)
 Anatolii Korobkin (14 July 1983 – 15 September 1986)
 Petr Shemetov (27 November 1986 – 16 February 1998)
 Yurii Gusev (28 April 1998 –  29 April 2013)
 Olga Molchanova (29 April 2013 – 22 May 2014)
 Alexandr Novikov (7 July 2014 – 2021)
Pavel Novgorodov (since 7 February 2021).

NSUEM today 
Novosibirsk State University of Economics and Management (NSUEM) is the biggest educational complex in the field of economics in Western Siberia.

Over 13 thousand students study in NSUEM. The number of faculty members is over 490 persons, among them 47 are Doctors of Science and 213 are PhD of Science.

NSUEM has tier system of continuous education: undergraduate, graduate, and doctoral programs. The Thesis Board works at NSUEM. Business College of NSUEM is the institution of secondary vocational education, which has 9 specializations.

There are 4 faculties at NSUEM:
 Faculty of Corporate Economics and Entrepreneurship
 Faculty of Government
     Faculty of Law
 Faculty of Basic Education

Another level of NSUEM education system is postgraduate education:
 Additional training and professional education courses; 
 Educational centers and schools
NSUEM actively implements state-of-the-art educational technologies: professional simulations, workshops, project method, and on-line education. As a result of practice-oriented education almost 90% NSUEM graduate students find job immediately after graduation. NSUEM is a regional center of postgraduate education: MBA program provides training for the top-managers, APTECH program trains IT-specialists. Also there are retraining programs and advanced training programs. Cooperation with international Universities and organizations is an integral part of NSUEM life, which leads to active student exchange programs.

University structure

Faculty of Corporate Economics and Entrepreneurship  

Faculty of Corporate Economics and Entrepreneurship is a structural subdivision of NSUEM

In 2015 a new step of development has begun in NSUEM, within the University reconstruction Institutes of Economics and Management were united into Faculty of economics.

At the moment Faculty of Economics is the biggest in NSUEM by the quantity of students.

Acting dean – Vladiimir Kiz, PhD.

 Department of Service Business
 Department of information and analytical support and accounting
Department of Corporate Governance and Finance
Department of Marketing, Advertising and Public Relations
Department of Financial Market and Financial Institutions
Department of Labor Economics and Human Resources
Department of Innovation and Entrepreneurship

Faculty of Basic Education 

Faculty of Basic Education is a structural subdivision of NSUEM.

Acting Dean – Lada Shekhovtsova

 Department of Foreign Languages
Department of Physical Education and Sport
Department of Philosophy and Humanities
Department of Economic Theory
Department of Mathematics and Natural Sciences
Center of Secondary Vocational Education

Faculty of Government 

Faculty of Government

Acting Dean – Vladimir Romashin, PhD.

 Department of Statistics
 Department of Sociology
 Department of World Economy, International Relations and Law
 Department of Public Finance
 Department of Psychology, Pedagogy and Law
 Department of Regional Economics and Management
 Department of Environmental Safety and Environmental Management
 Department of Applied Informatics
 Department of Information Technology

Faculty of Law 
the demand of the education programs development, NSUEM launches Faculty of Law. “Legal clinic” is a part of the Faculty. Faculty is oriented for lawyers training for organizations of different economy spheres. The graduates work in different government structures; hold the position in the departments of the Ministry of Internal Affairs of the Russian Federation.

Acting Dean – Oleg Sherstoboev, PhD.

 Department of Administrative, Financial and Corporate Law
 Department of Civil and Business Law
 Department of Theory and History of State and Law
 Department of Criminal Law and National Security.

Academic activities 

NSUEM academic day starts at 08.00 a.m and lasts till 20.00. In the group schedule there are 4 classes the most. Students attend lectures and seminars. Academic activities are held in auditoriums, computer classes, and specially equipped laboratories.

University students actively take part in regional. All-Russian, national, international seminars, Olympic, forums and other events.

Extra-curricular activities 

NSUEM offers 7 areas of extra-curricular activities:

 Leadership and initiatives;
 International relations;
 Analytics, science and innovation;
 Culture and creation work;
 Healthy lifestyle and safety & security;
 Business and Entrepreneurship;
 Politics and governance.

Each area combines representatives from NSUEM and business and governmental society representatives.

Student’s life in NSUEM 

Since 1996 NSUEM launched a Student's club. The club owns modern lightning and sound equipment. Permanently students Club has:

 Vocal class;
 School of modern dance “High voltage”;
 Art-ballet “Shpilhouse”;
 Literature club;
 Theatre studio;
 Design and ornamental studio “Masteritca”;
 Esthetic development studio “fashion studio Ocean”;
 Guitar music club

International relations in NSUEM 

NSUEM is an active participant of academic and scientific exchange programs. University has over 150 international Agreements. Since 1991 NSUEM works with international organizations and launches international projects. NSUEM cooperates with:
CIS countries, Federal Republic of Germany, Republic of China, Mongolia, Republic of Korea, United States, France, Czech Republic, Republic of India, etc.

Main directions of International activities are:
 Students exchange programs;
 Interuniversity cooperation;
 Scientific and research projects

Educational programs in the frames of academic exchange:
 Student's exchange programs;
 Language schools;
 Summer schools;
 Double Degree programs;
 MBA co-programs;
 Teachers exchange programs;
 Scientific and research programs;
 New approaches in teaching technologies.

NSUEM partners:
 Xinjiang University, China
 Dalian University of foreign languages, China
 Mudanjiang Normal University, China
 SolBridge, International Business school
 State University of New York, USA
 Coburg University of Applied Sciences, Germany
 Management College, Mancosa, Republic of South Africa
 Arena Multimedia], Republic of India
 Animation Surat

Over 200 students and teaching staff took part in exchange programs and international events. NSUEM welcomed official delegation of: South Africa, Republic of India, Japan, Federal Republic of Germany, etc.

NSUEM publications

“NSUEM reporter”, a scientific magazine 
NSUEM reporter is issued 4 times a year.

Chief editor – Vladimir Glinskiy, Doctor of economics, professor, Head of Statistic Department, NSUEM

Scientific Magazine “Ideas and ideals” 
Issued once a quarter (in 2 parts)

Humanitarian almanac «Human.RU»/ 
Almanac publishes: modern research results in the spheres of: philosophy, psychology, pedagogic, traditional and modern anthropology practices.

Newspaper «Our Academy» 
It is issued once in 2 weeks, having 16 columns. It covers: University life, interviews, scientific research results, etc.  The circulation is 500 distributed in University. “Our Academy” has its e-publication within the official web-site of NSUEM. .

Entering NSUEM 
Entering NSUEM for Bachelor's degree is based on the results of Unified State Exam

External links 
 

 
Tomsk
Kemerovo
Universities in Altai Krai
Buildings and structures in Novosibirsk
Universities in Novosibirsk Oblast